Otherworld is a collaborative album by English singer Peter Hammill and American guitarist Gary Lucas. It was released in February 2014 by Esoteric Recordings.

Although on the album cover the title is spelled as "Other World", on Peter Hammill's official website Sofa Sound the title is spelled as one word, "Otherworld".

Track listing
All songs written by Gary Lucas and Peter Hammill.
"Spinning Coins" – 2:54
"Some Kind of Fracas" – 5:14
"Of Kith & Kin" – 5:30
"Cash" – 2:57
"Built from Scratch" – 4:25
"Attar of Roses" – 4:20
"This Is Showbiz" – 3:05
"Reboot" – 6:55
"Black Ice" – 4:59
"The Kid" – 4:16
"Glass" – 3:27
"2 Views" – 3:07
"Means to an End" – 1:38
"Slippery Slope" – 7:04

Personnel
Peter Hammill – guitars, instruments, vocals
Gary Lucas – guitars

Technical
Peter Hammill - recording engineer, mixing (Terra Incognita, Wiltshire)
Paul Ridout - design

References

Peter Hammill albums
Gary Lucas albums
2014 albums
Esoteric Recordings albums